Anagha Arun Deshpande (born 19 November 1985 in Solapur, Maharashtra) is a cricketer who has played in 20 women's One Day Internationals and seven Twenty20 internationals for India. She has played for India Blue Women, India Under-21s Women, India Women cricket teams of India.

In June 2020, she was appointed as coach by Uttarakhand Cricket Association (UCA) of Uttarakhand women's U-16 and U-19 teams.

References

1985 births
India women One Day International cricketers
India women Twenty20 International cricketers
Indian women cricketers
Living people
Maharashtra women cricketers
Pondicherry women cricketers
Marathi people
People from Maharashtra
People from Solapur
West Zone women cricketers